The Alpspitze is a mountain, 2628 m, in Bavaria, Germany. Its pyramidal peak is the symbol of Garmisch-Partenkirchen and is one of the best known and most attractive mountains of the Northern Limestone Alps. It is made predominantly of Wetterstein limestone from the Upper Triassic.

Ascent 
Several klettersteigs run up the Alpspitze. The shortest ascent starts at the valley station of Osterfelderkopf (2,033 m) on the Alpspitze Cable Car from Garmisch-Partenkirchen. From the Osterfelderkopf the Alpspitze may be climbed either directly along the Alpspitz-Ferrata, an easy, mostly protected and much frequented klettersteig (ca. 2 hours from the Osterfelderkopf) or the summit may be reached on the North Face Climb (Nordwandsteig), which runs in a curve to the east into the Oberkar cirque and from there along the left-hand edge of the cirque to the top.

Another ascent runs from the col of Grießkarscharte (2,460 m), which is reached either from the Höllentalanger Hut in the Höllental valley via the cirque of Mathaisenkar (involving a klettersteig) or from the lake of Stuibensee via the Grießkar cirque.

The popular route from the Alpspitze via the arete of Jubiläumsgrat to the Zugspitze is a long and difficult climbing tour, which involves UIAA grade III sections.

Summit cross 
The summit cross was erected in 1946 by Richard Weber and Kaspar Jocher together with the Roman Catholic Kolpingsfamilie of Garmisch. On the 25th and 50th anniversary of its installation a commemorative plaque was fixed to the cross.

Observation platform 
At its base is the 'AlpspiX Viewing Platform', 2 curved metal walkways reaching out 13 metres (42 feet) over a cliff, crossing over each other, making the shape of an X.

Gallery

References

External links
 AlpspiX Viewing Platform

Mountains of Bavaria
Mountains of the Alps
Two-thousanders of Germany
Articles containing video clips